Douglas 'Doug' Nelson (born May 28, 1959)  judoka. Nelson was on the 1984 US Olympic team for judo.

References

Living people
1959 births
Olympic judoka of the United States
Judoka at the 1972 Summer Olympics
Judoka at the 1984 Summer Olympics
American male judoka
Pan American Games medalists in judo
Pan American Games bronze medalists for the United States
Judoka at the 1983 Pan American Games
Judoka at the 1987 Pan American Games
Medalists at the 1983 Pan American Games
Medalists at the 1987 Pan American Games
20th-century American people
21st-century American people